Melzerella monnei is a species of beetle in the family Cerambycidae. It was described by Wappes and Lingafelter in 2011.

References

Aerenicini
Beetles described in 2011